Jürgen Wielert (born 5 July 1960) is a retired German football midfielder.

References

External links
 

1960 births
Living people
German footballers
Bundesliga players
VfL Bochum players
Rot-Weiß Oberhausen players
DSC Wanne-Eickel players
Association football midfielders